Anton Wilhelm Hendrik "Tonnie" van As (1 April 1928 – 30 May 2021) was a Dutch footballer who played as a left winger.

He played for SBV Vitesse during the 1947–48 and 1948–49 seasons. In later years he played for lower division teams of Vitesse, also due to injuries. He emigrated in the 1950s to Canada. He married in Canada and started working as a dentist. He had children and grandchildren.

Van As died on 30 May 2021, aged 93.

Career statistics

References

1928 births
2021 deaths
Dutch footballers
Association football wingers
Dutch emigrants to Canada
SBV Vitesse players